Copythorne Common is a   nature reserve west of Southampton in Hampshire. It is managed by the Hampshire and Isle of Wight Wildlife Trust. It is part of the New Forest, which is a Special Area of Conservation and a Site of Special Scientific Interest.

The common has grassland, woods and dry heath. Birds include long-tailed tits and woodlarks, while there are reptiles such as slow worms, adders and common lizards.

References

Hampshire and Isle of Wight Wildlife Trust